The Sacred Heart College is a secondary school based in Omagh, County Tyrone, Northern Ireland.

Principals

Notable former pupils
 Neamh Woods, Northern Ireland netball international and Tyrone Ladies' Gaelic footballer. Woods also worked as a PE teacher at the school.

References

Omagh
Catholic secondary schools in Northern Ireland
Secondary schools in County Tyrone